Rashad Steward Baker (born February 22, 1982) is a former American football safety. He was signed by the Buffalo Bills as an undrafted free agent in 2004. He played college football at Tennessee.

Baker was also a member of the Minnesota Vikings, New England Patriots, Philadelphia Eagles and Oakland Raiders.

Early life and college career
Born in Camden, New Jersey, Baker attended Woodrow Wilson High School in Camden. Baker then attended the University of Tennessee. Although Tennessee recruited Baker as a wide receiver, Baker switched to free safety in the fourth game his freshman year; Baker never played as free safety while in high school. Baker started four seasons for the Tennessee Volunteers football team from 2000 to 2003 and also ran 110-meter hurdles on the Tennessee track team.  With Tennessee, Baker started 41 of 45 games played and had 233 tackles, 11 interceptions, and 24 passes deflected. Baker made second-team All-SEC honors  in 2001 as a sophomore and first-team All-SEC honors as a junior in 2002.

Professional career

Buffalo Bills
A projected sixth-round pick for the 2004 NFL Draft, Baker was signed by the Buffalo Bills as an undrafted free agent in 2004 and played for the team through the 2006 season. Baker started 3 games of 14 played in his rookie season 2004 and never started any of 14 games played in 2005. As a rookie, Baker had 22 tackles, 1 pass deflected, 1 interception with a 26-yard return, and 1 forced fumble in 2004. In 2005, Baker had 18 tackles, 1 pass deflected, and 1 interception returned for 18 yards.

Minnesota Vikings
On September 2, 2006, the Bills waived Baker. The Minnesota Vikings signed Baker the next day. Baker played one game as a reserve for the Vikings on October 1 and was released on November 4.

New England Patriots
Baker was claimed off waivers by the New England Patriots on November 7, 2006. He played 5 games with the Patriots in 2006 with 5 tackles. In 2007, Baker played 8 games and had 12 tackles. He was released on December 19, 2007.

First stint with Raiders
Baker was picked up by the Oakland Raiders off waivers on the same day he was waived by New England. In the 2008 offseason, Baker's jersey number was changed from 28 to 22 to accommodate free agent acquisition Gibril Wilson.  He later changed his number to 27. In 2008, Baker played 10 games with 1 start for the Raiders and made 24 tackles, 4 passes deflected, and 3 interceptions.

Philadelphia Eagles
Baker signed a one-year contract with the Philadelphia Eagles on March 11, 2009. He was released on August 18.

Second stint with Raiders
Baker re-signed with the Raiders on August 19, 2009.  His number 27 was taken by Jason Horton, so Baker chose number 32.  He was released from the Raiders on September 5, 2009.

NFL statistics

References

External links
New England Patriots bio
Oakland Raiders bio
Philadelphia Eagles bio

1982 births
Living people
Woodrow Wilson High School (New Jersey) alumni
Players of American football from Camden, New Jersey
American football safeties
Tennessee Volunteers football players
Buffalo Bills players
Minnesota Vikings players
New England Patriots players
Oakland Raiders players
Philadelphia Eagles players